Uralo-Kavkaz is an urban-type settlement in Krasnodon Municipality in the southeastern part of Luhansk Oblast, Ukraine. Population: , .

The settlement is located on the banks of the Duvanna River, in the basin of the Donets River, close to the border with Russia.

History
Uralo-Kavkaz (literally Urals and Caucasus) and was founded in 1914, when the Urals and Caucasus Joint-stock Company started operating a coal mine here. The settlement was developed to serve this one and the subsequently opened mines. At the time, it belonged to Slavyanoserbsk Uyezd of Yekaterinoslav Governorate. In 1920, Donetsk Governorate with the center in Luhansk (later in Bakhmut) was established, and the uyezd was transferred to Donetsk Governorate. On 7 March 1923, the uyezds were abolished, and Sorokine Raion of Luhansk Okruha was established. Uralo-Kavkaz was included into Sorokine Raion. On 14 February 1925, Donetsk Governorate was abolished, and okruhas were directly subordinated to the Ukrainian Soviet Socialist Republic. On 2 September 1930, okruhas were abolished as well, and raions were directly subordinated to the Republic. In 1930, Sorokine Raion became a Russian National Raion; this status was later in the 1930s abolished. On 2 July 1932, Donetsk Oblast was established, and Sorokine Raion was transferred to Donetsk Oblast. In March 1936, Sorokine Raion was renamed Krasnodon Raion. On 3 June 1938, Donetsk Oblast was split into Stalino Oblast and Voroshilovgrad Oblast. When Krasnodon became a city of oblast significance and split off Krasnodon Raion, Uralo-Kavkaz was subordinated to the city of Krasnodon. In 1958, Voroshilovgrad Oblast was renamed Luhansk Oblast, in 1970 it was renamed back Voroshilovgrad Oblast, and in 1991 it was renamed Luhansk Oblast.

In January 1989 the population was 3365 people.

After 1991, in independent Ukraine, Uralo-Kavkaz became a major center of criminal activity. The only significant economic activity in the settlement involved illegal coal mining and smuggling of goods through the border with Russia.

Since 2014, Uralo-Kavkaz has been controlled by forces of the Luhansk People's Republic.

References

Urban-type settlements in Dovzhansk Raion